X Factor is a Danish television music competition to find new singing talent. The second season premiered on 2 January 2009 and ended on 27 March on DR1. Lise Rønne returned as host, while Thomas Blachman, Lina Rafn and Remee returned as judges.

Judges and hosts

In March 2008, Thomas Blachman announced that he would not be returning as a judge for season 2. On 18 September 2008, Ekstra Bladet revealed that Lina Rafn would be returning as a judge for season 2. The following day, it was officially confirmed that Blachman, Rafn and Remee would all be returning as judges for season 2. Lise Rønne returned as host.

Selection process

Auditions
Auditions took place in Copenhagen and Århus in 2008.

Superbootcamp
Remee was given the Groups category, Rafn was given the Over 25s and Blachman was given the 15-24s.

Bootcamp
For the first time in the show's history, the judges had an assistant to help them decide which acts to send through to the live shows. Remee was assisted by Martin Dodd, but Rafn and Blachman were not assisted.

The 6 eliminated acts were:
15-24s: Patricia (put into Alien Beat Club), Patrick
Over 25s: Janus, Lotus
Groups: Anders & Elisabeth, Soul Connect

Contestants

Key:
 – Winner
 – Runner-up

Live shows
The live shows began on 13 February 2009 and ended on 27 March 2009 at DR Byen.

Colour key:
{|
|-
| –  Contestant was in the bottom two and had to sing again in the final showdown
|-
| – Contestant received the fewest public votes and was immediately eliminated (no final showdown)
|-
|}

Contestants' colour key:
{|
|-
| – Rafn's contestants (Over 25s)
|-
| – Remee's contestants (Groups)
|-
| – Blachman's contestants (15-24s)

|}

Note 1: In the semifinal the two acts who received the most votes from the Danish public will automatically progress to the final. The two acts with the fewest votes will sing again in the final showdown and then the public decides who will go through to the final.

Live show details
Colour key:
{|
|-
| –  Contestant was in the bottom two and had to sing again in the final showdown
|-
| – Contestant was eliminated
|-
| – Contestant was saved by the public
|-
|}

Week 1 (13 February)
Theme: Hits

Judges' votes to eliminate
 Remee: Claus Lillelund
 Rafn: Tårnhøj
 Blachman: Tårnhøj

Week 2 (20 February)
Theme: Made in Denmark

Judges' votes to eliminate
 Blachman: Claus Lillelund
 Rafn: Lucas Claver
 Remee: Claus Lillelund

Week 3 (27 February)
Theme: Motown

Judges' votes to eliminate
 Remee: Seest Christensen
 Rafn: Asian Sensation
 Blachman: Seest Christensen

Week 4 (6 March)
Theme: Songs by ABBA

Judges' votes to eliminate
 Remee: Sidsel Vestertjele
 Blachman: Asian Sensation
 Rafn: Asian Sensation

Week 5 (13 March)
Theme: DR Bigband

Judges' votes to eliminate
 Remee: Lucas Claver
 Rafn: Mohamed Ali
 Blachman: Lucas Claver

Week 6: Semi-final (20 March)
 Theme: Songs by Sanne Salomonsen; Dedication
Musical Guest: Sanne Salomonsen ("Hel Igen")

In this semi-final the two acts with the fewest votes will sing again in the final showdown and then the public decides who will go through to the final.

Week 7: Final (27 March)

References

Season 02
2009 Danish television seasons